Andronov is a Russian surname. Notable people with the surname include:

 Aleksandr Andronov (1901–1952), Soviet physicist
 Yuriy Andronov (born 1971), Russian race walker

See also 
 Andronov–Pontryagin criterion of dynamical systems
 Andronov (crater), a lunar crater
 11003 Andronov, a minor planet

Russian-language surnames